Jose Ramon Gonzalez Delgado (born in Holguin, Cuba 1953) is a contemporary Cuban artist, painter, engraver and ceramist.

Education
Jose Ramon studied at the National Art School of Havana and graduated from CNSEA (Centro Nacional Superior Enseñanza Artistica) in 1982. He is a founding member of artists’ organizations like:  the AHS (Asociación Hermanos Saíz), the ACAA (Asociación Cubana de Artesanos Artistas) and of the National Union of Writers and Artists of Cuba (UNEAC).

Career
Jose Ramon worked as a painting teacher at the School of Arts in the Isle of Youth (Isla de la Juventud), where he founded the group Terracota 4 with Amelia Carballo, Angel Norniella and Agustin Villafaña. He then explored ceramics as a means of expression, taking the first steps by working on artistic installations, and enhancing the conceptual value of the works. This broadened the aesthetic panorama of the pottery in Cuba, which was considered a minor art until that time. Besides being a first figure of the pinera ceramics for the excellence of his work and his history as a member of the group Terracota 4 that gave national presence to the Isle of Youth in the ceramic field, stands out as a trainer of new figures that recognize the contributions of his teaching. Revolutionary was the first recognition of his work in Cuba, in 1981, with the proposal of trash cans, the acceptance of the original proposal was general, and the trash concepts of Jose Ramon Gonzalez were forever recognized as works of art. He has participated in different international ceramics events and competitions, and has been awarded with medals and prizes of acquisition. In 1995, Cuban state granted him the Award for the National culture for artistic lifetime achievements and contributions to the Cuban culture in 1995.

Jose Ramon's art is a conceptual and aesthetic one. From his first trash cans, Jose Ramon Gonzalez named them Concept of Garbage, a title that clarifies an interest in offering something more than a decorative piece. The object transcends as an idea, not as an end in itself, not even as a resource of the idea, because it commands not to grant it importance as such. His discursive strategy is widened by varying the contents of the trash cans, combining them with other objects -banks, bullets, dolls- (bank of patience, 1986), or dropping them into any corner of an imaginary street (Bad time, 1987). The strong desacralizing load of his works, the renewing proposal of redefinition of art with prominence in the idea, the transgression of the genre by his sculptural association, support it of the installation experience, accredits Jose Ramon Gonzalez, among the 10 most outstanding postmodern artists of Cuban ceramics.

Jose's work is exhibited at the Museum of Fine Arts of Cuba and in The Cuban Museum of Ceramics. It has been exhibited in Museum of Contemporary Hispanic Art. New York City, USA; Everson Museum of Art, Syracuse, New York. Also, he was a finalist at the International Competition of Artistic Ceramics. Faenza, Italy. (Editions 1985, 1987 and 1993) and other countries like Puerto Rico, Mexico, Russia, Brazil, Francia have witnessed the exhibition of his works. In recent years, he has been painting, engraving (doing solos exhibition) and exploring digital art from 2008 until present.

References

1953 births
Cuban artists
Living people